Jeremiah Francis Norberg (1948 – 20 February 2018), known as Frank Norberg, was an Irish hurler. His league and championship career with the Cork senior team lasted four seasons from 1969 to 1973. 

Born in Blackrock Cork, Norberg was raised in a strong hurling family. His grandfather, Jer Norberg, won an All-Ireland medals with Cork in 1893.

Norberg first appeared for the Blackrock club at juvenile and underage levels, before eventually joining the club's senior team. In a hugely successful career he won All-Ireland medals in 1972, 1974 and 1979. Norberg also won four Munster medal and five county championship medals.

Norberg made his debut on the inter-county scene when he was selected for the Cork minor team in 1966. He enjoyed one championship season with the minor team in which he was an All-Ireland runner-up. He subsequently joined the under-21 team, winning back-to-back All-Ireland medals in 1968 and 1969. By this stage Norberg was close to the Cork senior team and he made his debut during the 1969 Oireachtas Cup. Over the course of the following four seasons he won one Munster medal and one National League medal.

Biography
Frank Norberg was born in Blackrock County Cork in 1948.  The possessor of a most unusual surname, his ancestors settled in Ireland after leaving Finland.  Norberg was born into a family deeply associated with Cork hurling.  His grandfather, Jer Norberg, won an All-Ireland title with Cork in 1893.

Playing career

Club
Norberg played his club hurling with the famous Blackrock club in Cork.  He enjoyed some success at underage levels before winning his first senior county championship title in 1971.  This started a great run of success for the club, as ‘the Rockies’ later converted this county win into a Munster club title as well as an All-Ireland club title.  In 1973 Norberg won his second county medal with Blackrock.  Once again this win was converted into subsequent Munster and All-Ireland club honours.  The success continued in 1975 with Norberg winning a third set of county and provincial honours with his club.  'The Rockies' narrowly missed out on a third All-Ireland title after a defeat by James Stephens of Kilkenny.  A fourth county medal followed for Norberg in 1978, however, he missed the club’s Munster and All-Ireland victories.  He won a fifth county medal in 1979 and later collected his fourth Munster club title.

Minor & under-21
Norberg first came to prominence on the inter-county scene as a member of the Cork minor team in 1966.  That year he enjoyed his first success when he secured a Munster title following a 6-7 to 2-8 defeat of Galway.  Cork later faced Wexford in the All-Ireland final.  After a thrilling 6-7 apiece draw, Norberg's side were narrowly defeated in the replay by 4-1 to 1-8.

Two years later in 1968 Norberg was a small member of the Cork under-21 team.  He secured a Munster title in that grade following a 4-10 to 1-13 defeat of Tipperary.  An All-Ireland final appearance soon followed with Kilkenny providing the opposition.  An entertaining followed which eventually saw Cork triumph by 1-18 to 5-9.  It was an All-Ireland under-21 title for Norberg.

In 1969 Norberg was still eligible for the under-21 grade.  He added a second Munster title to his collection that year before later lining out in a second consecutive All-Ireland final.  Wexford were the opponents and after a high-scoring game Cork emerged as the winners by 5-13 to 4-7.  It was Norberg's second consecutive All-Ireland under-21 title.

Senior
Following his performances in the minor and under-21 grades Norberg joined the Cork senior hurling team in 1971.  He was a non-playing substitute that year, however, Cork enjoyed little success in the championship.

In 1972 Norberg, in spite of never having played, was appointed captain of the Cork.  After guiding his team to the National Hurling League title, Norberg later lined out in his first Munster final.  Clare were the opponents and a rout took place as Cork recorded a huge 6-18 to 2-8 victory.  It was Norberg's first Munster winners’ medal.  The game was not without incident as Norberg picked up a groin injury in that game and for a time it looked likely that his season was over.  He missed Cork's subsequent victory over London in the All-Ireland semi-final, however, he recovered in time to lead out his team against Kilkenny in the All-Ireland final. With time running out Cork were cruising to victory and lead ‘the Cats’ by eight points.  Norberg had to be substituted during the game, however, a victory seemed certain.  A Kilkenny fight-back saw the team draw level with Cork and score a further seven points without reply to capture a 3-24 to 5-11 victory.  It was a huge blow to a Cork team that seemed destined for victory.

Norberg was relegated to the substitutes' bench again in 1973 before leaving the inter-county set-up at the end of the year.

References

1948 births
2018 deaths
Blackrock National Hurling Club hurlers
Cork inter-county hurlers